Andrei Ahmed Bani Mustafa (born 22 August 2002) is a Romanian professional footballer who plays as an attacking midfielder or a winger for Liga II club Dinamo București.

Club career
Bani joined the youth setup of Dinamo București in 2015, having previously played for Pro Luceafărul București.

He made his professional debut for the former team on 23 February 2020, aged 17, in a 0–1 Liga I loss to Gaz Metan Mediaș. On 5 July that year, Bani scored his first goal in a 3–1 away win over Academica Clinceni.

Personal life
Bani was born in Bucharest to a Romanian mother and a father from Jordan.

Career statistics

Club

References

External links

Andrei Bani at Liga Profesionistă de Fotbal 

2002 births
Living people
Footballers from Bucharest
Romanian footballers
Romanian people of Arab descent
Association football midfielders
Association football wingers
Liga I players
FC Dinamo București players
Romania youth international footballers